The Waiting Room is the eleventh studio album by the British band Tindersticks, released in 2016 on the City Slang label. Some editions of the album came packaged with a short film that had been commissioned for each song by various directors.

Music
Opening track "Follow Me" was the final song recorded for the album. When the band needed a piece of music to act as an introduction, Stuart Staples and musical arranger Julian Siegel used the melody from Bronisław Kapers soundtrack to the 1962 film Mutiny on the Bounty, which Staples had found himself humming as he walked down the street. "We Are Dreamers!" features vocals by Jehnny Beth of Savages, who recorded her part in ten minutes.

Reception

At Metacritic, which assigns a normalised rating out of 100 to reviews from mainstream critics, The Waiting Room received an average score of 82, based on 20 reviews, indicating "universal acclaim". Marc Burrows of Drowned in Sound called it "a rich, warm, comfort blanket of a record, marbled with veins of darkness and light", while AllMusic reviewer Thom Jurek called it a "mixed bag".

Accolades

Track listing
All songs written by Stuart A. Staples, except where noted.
"Follow Me" (Bronislau Kaper) – 2:45
"Second Chance Man" – 3:56
"Were We Once Lovers?" – 4:49
"Help Yourself" – 5:38
"Hey Lucinda" (featuring Lhasa de Sela) – 5:16
"This Fear of Emptiness" (David Boulter) – 3:59
"How He Entered" (Dan McKinna, Staples) – 4:46
"The Waiting Room" – 4:54
"Planting Holes" (Boulter) – 2:03
"We Are Dreamers!" – 5:21
"Like Only Lovers Can" (Boulter, Staples) – 4:33

Charts

Weekly charts

Year-end charts

References

External links
 

2016 albums
City Slang albums
Tindersticks albums